John Wrottesley may refer to:

 Sir John Wrottesley, 4th Baronet, MP for Staffordshire (UK Parliament constituency) 1708–1710
 Sir John Wrottesley, 8th Baronet (1744–1787)
 John Wrottesley, 1st Baron Wrottesley (1771–1841)
 John Wrottesley, 2nd Baron Wrottesley (1798–1867)